François-Xavier Georges Joseph Marie Ghislain baron van der Straten-Waillet (22 January 1910 - 15 February 1998) was a Belgian politician for the Christian Social Party.

Biography 

 was a son of baron Alphonse van der Straten-Waillet (1884-1964), mayor of Westmalle, and of Irène Bosschaert de Bouwel (1885-1971). Van der Straten-Waillet married Marie-Thérèse Moretus Plantin de Bouchout (1912-2004) in 1935 and had six children.
He obtained his doctorate in law at the Catholic University of Leuven in 1932 and became a director of the Verbond van Kristelijke Werkgevers (League of Christian Employers).

In 1946, he was elected as a Member of Parliament for the Christian Social Party for the Arrondissement of Antwerp. From 1949 to 1950, he was the second party chair, succeeding August De Schryver.

Van der Straten became a government minister twice: Minister of Foreign Trade from 1947 to 1948, and Minister of Public Health and Family from 1948 to 1949. Afterwards, he became an ambassador of Belgium to several countries, namely to Argentina (1952-1955), The Netherlands (1955-1966), and Italy (1969-1975).

Publications

References 

1910 births
1998 deaths
Members of the Chamber of Representatives (Belgium)
Health ministers of Belgium
Ambassadors of Belgium
Belgian nobility